The Cook, the Thief, His Wife & Her Lover is a 1989 crime drama art film written and directed by Peter Greenaway, starring Richard Bohringer, Michael Gambon, Helen Mirren and Alan Howard in the title roles. An international co-production of the United Kingdom and France, the film's graphic violence and nude scenes, as well as its lavish cinematography and formalism, were noted at the time of its release.

Plot 
English gangster Albert Spica has taken over the high-class Le Hollandais restaurant, which is managed by French chef Richard Boarst. Spica makes nightly appearances at the restaurant with his retinue of thugs. His oafish behavior causes frequent confrontations with the staff and his own customers, whose patronage he loses but whose money he seems not to miss.

Forced to accompany Spica is his reluctant yet elegant wife, Georgina, who soon catches the eye of a quiet regular at the restaurant: bookshop owner Michael. Under her husband's nose, with the help of the restaurant staff, Georgina carries on an affair with Michael. Ultimately, Spica learns of the affair, forcing Georgina to hide out at Michael's book depository. Boarst sends food to Georgina through his young employee Pup, a boy soprano who sings while working. Spica tortures the boy before finding the bookstore's location written in a book the boy is carrying. Spica's men storm Michael's bookshop while Georgina is visiting the boy in hospital. They torture Michael to death by force-feeding him pages from his books. Georgina discovers his body when she returns.

Overcome with rage and grief, she begs Boarst to cook Michael's body, and he eventually complies. Together with all the people that Spica wronged throughout the film, Georgina confronts her husband finally at the restaurant and forces him at gunpoint to eat a mouthful of Michael's cooked body. Spica obeys, gagging. Georgina then shoots him in the head, calling him a cannibal.

Cast 

 Richard Bohringer as Richard Boarst, "The Cook": The head chef of "Le Hollandais". He resents Albert Spica, who has taken control of the restaurant.
 Michael Gambon as Albert Spica, "The Thief": A violent gangster and owner of "Le Hollandais", with pretensions of being a gourmet, but his coarse and violent behavior wreaks destruction on everyone around him.
 Helen Mirren as Georgina Spica, "The Wife": The sophisticated and battered wife of Albert Spica, from whom she has unsuccessfully tried to escape.
 Alan Howard as Michael, "The Lover": An erudite bookshop owner who dines at "Le Hollandais" every night while reading a book. He carries on a doomed affair with Georgina.
 Tim Roth as Mitchel, a dim-witted goon in Spica's gang.
 Ciarán Hinds as Cory, a pony-tailed pimp who is ejected from Spica's gang after he protests Spica's brutal treatment of his girls.
 Gary Olsen as Spangler, a brutal member of Spica's gang.
 Ewan Stewart as Harris, a less brutal member of Spica's gang.
 Roger Ashton-Griffiths as Turpin, the bespectacled book-keeper in Spica's gang.
 Liz Smith as Grace, Spica's mother, somnolent and no more suited to the enjoyment of fine dining than her son.
 Ian Dury as Terry Fitch, in a rare acting appearance, as a rival gangster.
 Diane Langton as May Fitch, Terry's wife.
 Paul Russell as Pup, a kitchen boy who brings food to Georgina and Michael while they are in hiding at Michael's bookshop. He is a boy soprano who sings while washing dishes.
 Emer Gillespie as Patricia, one of Cory's luckless girls who tell Spica about his wife's affair.
 Ron Cook as Mews, a bespectacled member of Spica's gang.
 Alex Kingston as Adele, a red-dressed waitress at the restaurant.
 Roger Lloyd-Pack as Geoff, a fellow gangster and diner.
 Bob Goody as Starkie, a member of Spica's gang.

Production

Writing 
Peter Greenaway has said that the Jacobean play 'Tis Pity She's a Whore provided him with the main template for his screenplay.

Music 
Michael Nyman's score prominently incorporated his 1985 composition Memorial.

Design 
Jean-Paul Gaultier designed the costumes. Italian chef Giorgio Locatelli prepared the food, used as props.

Release

Box office 
The film debuted at the 1989 Toronto International Film Festival and was released on 13 October 1989 in London on two screens. It grossed over $500,000 in London. During its opening week in Paris it grossed $158,500.

It earned £640,213 in the UK.
Miramax acquired the rights for $500,000, and released the film in New York on 6 April 1990. It was Greenaway's first film to be released fully in the US since The Draughtsman's Contract in 1982. It grossed $7.7 million in the US.

Versions 
The film's original running time was 124 minutes. Due to the content, the MPAA gave Miramax a choice of either an X rating or go unrated (adults only) for theatrical release. Unrated was chosen in light of the X rating being more associated with pornographic films. Two versions of the film were released on VHS in the 1990s. One was an R-rated cut running 95 minutes (mainly for large video store chains); the other was the original version.

Critical reception 
The film received generally positive reviews from critics. On Rotten Tomatoes, it holds an 86% rating based on 49 reviews, with an average rating of 7.60/10. The site's consensus states: "This romantic crime drama may not be to everyone's taste, but The Cook, the Thief, His Wife & Her Lover is an audacious, powerful film." The film received a score of 62 on Metacritic based on reviews from 23 critics, indicating "generally favorable reviews". 
Roger Ebert of the Chicago Sun-Times gave the film four out of four stars, noting that the film's raw emotion and violent interpersonal conflict was a departure from Greenaway's typically cerebral and intellectual films.

Soundtrack 

The Cook, the Thief, His Wife & Her Lover is the twelfth album release by Michael Nyman and the ninth to feature the Michael Nyman Band. The album includes the first commercially released recording of Nyman's composition "Memorial".

There is some music not included on the soundtrack album: the love theme for Michael and Georgina, which is "Fish Beach" from Drowning by Numbers, the song performed as a show in the restaurant, sung by actress and singer Flavia Brilli, or a doubly pulsed variation of "Memorial" that occurs about halfway through the film. Edits of "Memorial" appear throughout the film, with the entire twelve-minute movement accompanying the final scene and end credits, but one variation is uniquely created for the film.

References to Flemish Baroque painting 

The filming is inspired by Flemish Baroque painting as Peter Paul Rubens or Anthony van Dyck. The Banquet of the Officers of the St George Militia Company in 1616, a painting by Frans Hals, appears on the restaurant wall.

References

External links 

 
 
 

1989 films
1989 crime drama films
1989 romantic drama films
British crime drama films
British independent films
British romantic drama films
Adultery in films
Films about cannibalism
Films about domestic violence
Films about violence against women
Cooking films
Films directed by Peter Greenaway
Films set in restaurants
Films shot in Hertfordshire
Obscenity controversies in film
Films scored by Michael Nyman
1989 independent films
1980s English-language films
1980s British films